White Hot Peach is the second studio album by Primitive Radio Gods, released on October 24, 2000. Quite different in sound from their previous album Rocket, White Hot Peach features much less of the sampling that made the band famous. Most of the material from this album is from Mellotron On!, the album the band planned on releasing through Sire Records in 1999, but could not due to that label's bankruptcy.

Track listing

References

2000 albums
Primitive Radio Gods albums
What Are Records? albums